Makaraingo is a rural municipality in western Madagascar. It belongs to the Ambatomainty District, which is a part of Melaky Region. The population was 5,915 inhabitants in 2018.

References 

Populated places in Melaky